Zoé Kabila Mwanza Mbala (born 26 June 1979) is a Congolese politician and Member of the National Assembly of the Democratic Republic of the Congo.

His father was the late President of the Democratic Republic of the Congo Laurent-Désiré Kabila, and he is the brother of former President Joseph Kabila and National Assembly Member Jaynet Kabila.

Kanila was the governor of  Tanganyika Province, but he was voted out in 2021. He was replaced in the following year by Julie Ngungwa.

References

1979 births
Living people
Members of the National Assembly (Democratic Republic of the Congo)
People's Party for Reconstruction and Democracy politicians
Children of national leaders
Place of birth missing (living people)